The Boeing Model 307 Stratoliner (or Strato-Clipper in Pan American service, or C-75 in USAAF service) is an American stressed-skin four-engine low-wing tailwheel monoplane airliner derived from the B-17 Flying Fortress bomber, which entered commercial service in July 1940. It was the first airliner in revenue service with a pressurized cabin, which with supercharged engines, allowed it to cruise above the weather. When it entered commercial service it had a crew of five to six, including two pilots, a flight engineer, two flight attendants and an optional navigator, and had a capacity for 33 passengers, which later modifications increased, first to 38, and eventually to 60.

Development

In 1935, Pan American Airways, United Airlines, American Airlines, Eastern Air Lines and Transcontinental & Western Air (T&WA) had each signed a contract with Douglas to develop the 40 passenger DC-4 (later known as the DC-4E). Due to development problems and poor performance, all of the airlines dropped out of the DC-4 program and cancelled their orders, but a requirement for a large 4 engine airliner remained.

D.W. Tommy Tomlinson at T&WA carried out five years of high altitude flight research, with a Northrop Gamma and a Douglas DC-1, which helped determine that T&WA would need a four-engine airliner with a pressurized cabin. During this period, He also test flew the XB-17 and determined that it would provide an ideal basis for an airliner, and so Boeing was approached with the idea. A ceiling of at least  was required to avoid summertime "chop" over the Rocky Mountains, and to allow the aircraft to fly around the thunderstorms that can sometimes block mountain passes, which meant a pressurized cabin would be the most comfortable for passengers on long flights. In 1935, Boeing then designed a four-engine airliner using components from the Boeing Model 299 B-17 Flying Fortress heavy bomber as the Model 307.

The pressurization system required extensive testing, which was carried out over many months, progressively increasing the air pressure after each successful test, and each time, the highly polished fuselage was coated with soapy water while the fuselage pressurized, for workers to look for the bubbles that would indicate a leak, much like testing a bicycle inner tube.

Before the first aircraft had rolled out, T&WA's chief engineer discovered that the extruded metal tubing used for the wing spars was defective, with stress corrosion cracks produced by cold rolling the tubing to increase tensile strength. Affected aircraft included the prototype, the first Pan Am machine, and some early production B-17s, and resulted in T&WA having to have their engineers manually inspect every tube that was to be incorporated into their aircraft.

The first aircraft completed, registration NX19901, crashed on March 18, 1939. while being demonstrated after having been recently fitted with instruments to measure flight control forces. The Boeing 307 took off at 1257hrs (local time) from Boeing Field in Seattle with ten occupants, and they climbed to an altitude of  where stability tests were made and while carrying out side-slips near Alder, the aircraft stalled and entered a spin. It made two to three turns before the pilot was able to stop the spin using the engines, however the ensuing high speed dive and the forces that resulted from attempting to pull up before hitting the ground, resulted in the left outer wing tearing off with one engine still attached, followed by the right wing, just outside the outer engine, both of which also tore off parts of the tail as a result of the aileron cables pulling them against the fuselage, which then caused the aircraft to pancake into a forested area at 1317hrs. All ten aboard were killed, which included T&WA's representative, KLM's technical director, a Dutch Air Ministry representative, Boeing's test pilot, as well as their Chief Aerodynamicist and their Chief Engineer. Parachutes were available but the force of the spin prevented their use.

The crash delayed the program by over a year, beginning with a three-month investigation by the US Civil Aeronautics Authority, the precursor to the current Federal Aviation Administration, and Boeing to determine the causes. Flight and wind tunnel testing showed that both an extended dorsal fin and an enlarged vertical tail were needed to prevent the rudder stalling in a yaw, and solutions were flight tested on NC19903, including an intermediate solution consisting of just an extended dorsal fin. The resulting redesign was also incorporated into the redesign of the rear fuselage of the B-17E bomber. The wings were reinforced and Handley Page slots were added to the outer wing leading edges to improve low speed aileron control while the inboard flaps were also extended. The first several aircraft, including NC19902, NC19903, and NC19904 were all rolled out with the small tail and then modified later.

Test flights resumed on May 19, 1939, after the changes had been incorporated, and on June 20, 1939, the first flight was made with the "supercharged cabin" pressurization system on.

On March 13, 1940, Approved Type Certificate (ATC) number 719 was assigned to the Pan Am Boeing 307s, allowing commercial deliveries to commence. A second ATC was issued for the TWA aircraft, number 726, due to the numerous differences between the Pan Am and T&WA aircraft.

T&WA was concerned about excessive undercarriage stiffness from their experience with the test flights with the XB-17, which were to be modified for the airliner. T&WA flight tested the modified undercarriage, and in hard landings, easily exceeded the contract's minimum required  descent rate with a successful  landing descent.

T&WA was also concerned about the engine carburetor intake heaters being deliberately restricted by Boeing to prevent cooking the engines, which could potentially leave crews unable to clear ice. Their point was made when icing problems during a test flight on May 17, 1940, with NC19905, while carrying dignitaries in overcast conditions in the mountains resulted in three of the four engines failing, while the fourth was losing power, despite every measure being taken to clear the ice. This resulted in the aircraft making a belly landing in a field with a partially lowered undercarriage, just south of Lamar, Colorado. T&WA then modified the carburetor heating themselves and the aircraft was repaired and returned to service.

Boeing made claims both in their period advertising and in their current web site that it was the first high-altitude commercial transport, and the first with a flight engineer. However its first flight on December 31, 1938, was later than that of the Renard R-35 which also had a pressurized cabin for passengers and which flew on April 1, 1938. As for employing a flight engineer, it was preceded in the US on a commercial aircraft by Maddux Air Lines Ford Trimotors, whose "Mate" had the same responsibilities as a flight engineer. Additionally, all German World War One Riesenflugzeug multi-engine bombers had flight engineers as they were integral to the specification.

Design

As built, the Stratoliner used the all-metal stressed-skin cantilever wings from the B-17C mounted low on the fuselage to a constant chord center section faired to the fuselage, with four  Wright GR-1820 Cyclone air-cooled radial engines. TWA examples used GR-1820-G105A engines fitted with two stage superchargers for high altitude performance, while the Pan Am examples used the GR-1820-G102 with a single stage supercharger. Engine exhaust collector rings designed to reduce noise, and exhaust mufflers were installed. TWA aircraft were fitted with cowl flaps, to adjust engine cooling air, while Pan Am aircraft had fixed cowling rings without cowling gills. When operating in cooler conditions, the Pan Am aircraft could be fitted with a blanking disk that covered part of the front of the engine. Both versions had sufficient power to maintain altitude on only two engines, one of the KLM requirements. Both used three bladed Hamilton Standard Hydromatic constant speed propellers, and new high octane fuels were developed to help the engines operate under the increased supercharger pressure. Both versions had trailing edge flaps controlled with electric motors, although SA-307B for T&WA and the SB-307B for Hughes featured slotted flaps with prominent external hinges, while the Pan Am examples had simpler split flaps with flush hinges, similar to those used on the B-17s. After being modified, the SA-307B-1s used the wings and elevators from the B-17G with split flaps, and  Cyclones. On most, but not all examples, the leading edges of the wings, horizontal stabilizer and fin were fitted with rubber expanding type de-icing boots, which would inflate and deflate repeatedly to break ice from the flying surfaces. All movable surfaces, including the rudder, ailerons and elevators had fabric over a metal structure, and were aerodynamically balanced and fitted with adjustable trim tabs to lighten flight loads. The rudder and elevators also had hydraulic boost, to lighten control forces. The partially retractable main undercarriage had hydraulic brakes and used Goodyear 55x19x23 tires, and was raised and lowered with electric motors. Manual backups were provided for electrically driven systems, but the power had to be turned off before being used. A parking brake was provided, along with an emergency air brake system run off a bottle of compressed air, while the tailwheel was fully retractable.

The fuselage was described as being dirigible shaped, and was an elongated teardrop, with a constant  diameter tube lengthening it at its widest point. The structure consisted of continuous longitudinal stiffeners spaced every 9 degrees around the fuselage with radial hoop stiffeners mounted every  along the fuselage, reinforcing the similarity to a dirigible.
The cockpit was fitted with an autopilot, radios and a radio direction finder (RDF) for navigation.

The noted industrial designer Raymond Loewy designed the passenger cabin, with furnishings provided by Marshall Field's. It was divided into four compartments, each with six deep comfortable reclining chairs which could be converted into 16 sleeping berths. Each compartment was provided with adjustable air conditioning vents, reading lights, and a call button. Nine additional seats were provided along the port side of the aircraft, while washrooms which doubled as dressing rooms were provided at both ends of the cabin. The rear washroom was for women and was named the "ladies charm room". Its walls were covered in heavy plate glass mirrors, and it contained in its  area two dressing tables, each with a sink, plush upholstered stools, soft indirect lighting provided by fluorescent lamps, ashtrays, hot and cold running water, shelves with towels, and a separate cubicle for the toilet. The men's washroom was in front as the "Men's Lounge", and also had a separate cubicle for the toilet, two sinks, and outlets to run an electric razor. A galley of just  provided hot food was situated at the rear of the cabin, behind which was positioned the rear hemispherical pressure bulkhead. Extensive use was made of the latest in sound proofing, and the Dynafocal engine shock mounts were designed to reduce vibrations from being felt by the passengers. The air conditioning system used both electrical and mechanical systems, which drew air in through vents in leading edge of each wing near the roots to bring outside air to two engine driven superchargers that compressed the air, which was then passed through radiator condensers to cool the air, and it was then run through channels to the vents in the cabin. External hookups allowed ground air conditioner units to cool the cabin air when the engines were off.

Crew

The Stratoliners were normally flown with a pilot and co-pilot, and both Pan Am and T&WA aircraft carried a flight engineer to reduce the workload on the two pilots, by monitoring the engines for any problems and fine tuning them, while they also controlled fuel consumption from each of the tanks to maintain the aircraft's fore-aft and lateral balance. Too much fuel used in one tank could result in the aircraft becoming uncontrollable. They also monitored other aircraft systems, including hydraulics and the cabin pressurization system. The Flight engineer was also an Aircraft Maintenance Engineer (AME) and aside from operating the radio, which required training in Morse code, he was also responsible for all technical issues, and would carry out repairs and maintenance on the 307s. Pan Am aircraft had one additional crew member compared to T&WA aircraft. Because they made long overwater flights, they carried a navigator, who wasn't yet considered necessary by the CAA for overland flights, which were served by a network of beacons across the continent, when the aircraft weren't being flown by visual flight rules (VFR).

Both T&WA and Pan Am normally carried two flight attendants. T&WA began using Hostesses (as they called them) as cabin crew in late 1935, while Pan Am continued to use male stewards until late in WW2.

C-75 conversion

Following the entry of the United States into World War II in December 1941, long-range transports were needed to ferry government and military officials around the globe and many aircraft, including T&WA's Boeing 307s, were pressed into service. Beginning in February 1942, these were flown to Albuquerque, New Mexico for conversion, which included the removal of the plush, but heavy civilian fittings, including the massive mirrors in the women's "charm room" and the pressurization system to save weight. The sound insulation was also stripped out leaving the cabin much noisier than it had been. The forward men's washroom, and two of the four forward compartments were replaced with five gravity fed  fuel tanks and a  oil tank fed with a wobble pump, along with a rest area for the crew. A desk was added behind the pilot for a radio operator, who had a 50 watt Bendix TA-12 high frequency Morse transmitter, and a BC-348 tunable receiver. A  trailing wire antenna was used with a  lead weight on the end - which the radio operator needed to remember to reel in, by hand, when landing. Inexperience sometimes led to either the antenna being torn off, or lashing against the fuselage. An astrodome was fitted and the perspex top windows which produced excessive parallax were replaced with optically flat glass, to allow the navigator to take star shots (the angle between stars and the horizon could be used to determine how far north or south they were), necessary to determine their position when crossing large bodies of water. The SA-307B-1s retained the astrodomes when converted back from C-75 in 1944. To further aid navigation, a B-3 driftmeter was installed, along with an aperiodic compass that didn't lag or lead in turns as a conventional compass does. Mae West life vests and life rafts were also provided.

The overloading burnt out engines and destroyed piston rings, but closely monitoring engine oil consumption often caught failures before they occurred.

Passenger facilities were reduced to 4 bunks which when folded away allowed seating for 12, along with 4 seats along the opposite side of the aircraft. Removable tables were provided in the cabin to lay out maps and do paperwork. The exterior was then camouflaged in standard USAAF colours, with olive drab upper surfaces and neutral grey undersides, and each aircraft had its name painted on the nose and over the cabin door, which would also be used by many later operators. The names had previously been used in TWA publicity, but not painted on the aircraft.

After three years the USAAF had amassed sufficient long range transports that it no longer needed the C-75s, and they sold the fleet back to TWA, who paid to have them converted back to civil standard under Boeing's SA-307B-1 designation. New propellers and landing gear were also installed. The change to the tailplane required that the structural bulkhead supporting the forward spar be moved aft, while the rear bulkhead was reworked and additional fuselage stiffeners were added. The tailwheel switched to using B-17G wheels and 26" smooth tread tires, which required that the wheel well be enlarged, and structure supporting the tailwheel reinforced. The main undercarriage wheels, tires, tubes & brakes remained unchanged, although the legs themselves were strengthened. The fuselages were stripped to bare metal and rewired with a 24VDC 1800 amp system from the B-29 Superfortress, replacing the original 24VDC 800 amp system. Slots were re-incorporated into the wingtip leading edges, as they had been with the pre-war airliners.
The cabin was redesigned and passenger capacity was increased from 33 to 38, with the cabin now divided into a 10-seat front section and a 28-seat rear section, with no sleepers. The cabin pressurization system was never re-installed The B-17G wings came with turbo-supercharger ducting for the engines that wasn't needed for the simpler supercharger installation used on the Stratoliner, while one duct opening was retained on each wing between the engine nacelles, to provide additional cabin air. Further mods made by TWA included improved sound proofing and temperature control and on March 15, 1945, the B-1 recertification tests were completed to the CAA's satisfaction. The estimated cost to repurchase and refurbish the five aircraft was $2 million.

Variants
 
300
Original unpressurized  proposal with seating for 16-24 passengers which began as a four-engined Boeing 247.

PAA-307 or S-307 Strato-Clipper
Designation for three aircraft built for Pan Am under  719. Visible external differences included engine cowlings without cowl flaps. Four  Wright GR-1820-G102A Cyclone engines were fitted, with single-speed superchargers. Crew of six. Strato-Clipper was Pan Am's name for the type.
SA-307B
Designation for five aircraft built for T&WA under  726. These differed externally from the Pan Am aircraft in having large external flap actuators. Four  Wright GR-1820-G105A Cyclone engines were fitted, with two-speed superchargers. Crew of five.
SB-307B
Designation for one uncertified aircraft built for Howard Hughes.
C-75
Five Trans World SA-307Bs were impressed into the USAAF. The cabin pressurization was removed to save weight, and the external flap actuators replaced.
SA-307B-1
The C-75s were overhauled and updated with modified B-17G wings (with 307 wing slots) and larger tailplanes mounted further aft.  Wright GR-1820-G205A Cyclone engines were fitted, along with B-29 electrical systems.
307C
Boeing wanted $267,230 + 13,000 per engine (or $319,230) but development was cancelled in favour of the 377 Stratocruiser, based on the B-29.
316
Airliner project developed from the XB-15 with pressurized cabin similar to that used on the Stratoliners, offered to KLM as a larger Stratoliner but not followed through with.
322
Development of 307 with similar fuselage but with a mid-mounted wing and a nosewheel, as a bomber. Eventually evolved into the B-29.

Operational history
Ten 307s were built. NC19906 was temporarily marked as NX1940 and NC1940 for publicity purposes.

Prototype

The first Boeing 307 Stratoliner, serial 1994, registration NX19901, made its first flight from Boeing Field, near Seattle on December 31, 1938, prior to its intended delivery to Pan Am following testing and certification. As related above, it crashed on a test-flight on March 18, 1939, killing all 10 occupants, and forced several design changes, of which the fin and rudder are the most immediately obvious.

Koninklijke Luchtvaart Maatschappij N.V. (KLM)
KLM was considering four-engine airliners for the European routes, and a longer ranged four-engine aircraft for their routes to the Netherlands East Indies (now Indonesia). Aircraft considered included the Douglas DC-4(E), the Boeing 307, the Junkers Ju 90, the Focke-Wulf Fw 200 Condor, and the Bloch 160, of which only the DC-4 and 307 came close to meeting their requirements

Boeing made a proposal to KLM on September 20, 1936, for exclusive option on 10 certified 307s for $2.4 million with options for 18 aircraft and with first delivery in 14 months. By January 14, 1937, the price had increased for 18 aircraft to $265,000 each, not including pressurization equipment. KLM let Boeing know that they were interested in 4 aircraft, for use as an interim measure pending a larger more suitable design, and they that they would use it for familiarization training with four engine aircraft. They required that it fly on just two engines, use Pratt & Whitney automatic mixture controls, have a  range, be able to carry freight or mail, and have moderate tire ground pressure. After not hearing back, Boeing sent a new quote to KLM for $300,000 per aircraft, or $320,000 for the pressurized version December 20, 1938, the KLM board made the decision to order two four-engine aircraft, with consideration of the Boeing 307 and Focke Wulf Fw 200 Condor, however the Condor was not suitable for the East Indies route.

Following T&WA defaulting on payments, the first three T&WA aircraft were offered to KLM in late 1939 but a quick decision was needed by Saturday, March 18, 1939, 
but KLM was unable to make that decision before the offer expired, and requested an extension. On March 21, 1939, KLM confirmed that they still planned to buy 307s and insisted that they were content with Boeing's progress. Ultimately though, KLM didn't buy the 307s because their representatives' test flight insurance coverage was rejected, and KLM found Boeing's response to providing for the next of kin unsatisfactory, a disagreement that wasn't cleared up until after World War 2. The insurance coverage on the aircraft was sufficiently large that it had the insurance industry worried about fallout, and as was the norm at the time, neither passengers nor crew could get coverage from any insurance company, but the aircraft itself was covered for a replacement cost of $500,000, with hull coverage and passenger liability, carried by Aero Insurance Underwriters and Associated Aviation Underwriters, despite the fact that Boeing was offering to sell the aircraft to KLM for much less than that.

Australian National Airways (ANA)
Another company that Boeing was in discussions with was Australian National Airways, who they quoted $310,000 per Stratoliner, or $340,000 for a pressurized version, on July 27, 1938, but nothing came of these discussions and ANA never operated the type.

Howard Hughes and Cosmic Muffin

The first customer delivery was to millionaire Howard Hughes on July 13, 1939. He bought aircraft serial number 1997 registered as NX19904 for $315,000 for a round-the-world flight, hoping to break his own record of 91 hours 14 minutes set between July 10 and 14 in 1938 in a Lockheed Model 14 Super Electra. Hughes' Stratoliner was fitted with extra fuel tanks and was ready for the first leg of the round-the-world attempt when Nazi Germany invaded Poland on September 1, 1939, causing the attempt to be cancelled. Hughes' aircraft was stored in Glendale, California for the duration of the war, prior to being converted into a flying condo. Hughes had the extra fuel tanks removed, and for around $250,000, he had it fitted with much more powerful Wright R-2600 engines for its transformation into "The Flying Penthouse", which included a Master Bedroom, two bathrooms, a galley and a bar as well as a living room. In 1949, Hughes spent an additional $100,000 renovating it so he could sell it, which, like the T&WA and Pan Am aircraft now included an interior designed by Raymond Loewy. Oil tycoon Glenn McCarthy bought it to coincide with the opening of his new Shamrock Hotel and he renamed it Shamrock  and had it repainted, however McCarthy defaulted on payments and it was returned to Hughes. It languished unflown until August 1965, when it was damaged beyond repair by Hurricane Cleo, with only about 500 hours on the airframe. It was then bought for $69 by Kenneth W. London, who cut the damaged wings and tail off, built a hull under it, and installed a pair of V-8 engines to convert it into a houseboat which he named Londonaire. After various repossessions, deaths and failed sales later, it became the Cosmic Muffin, in which form it still survives.

Transcontinental & Western Air (T&WA or TWA)

As one of the companies sponsoring the development of the Douglas DC-4, Transcontinental & Western Air lost interest due to delays and poor performance, but the agreement they signed with Douglas limited the maximum weight of any replacement design to 43,000 lbs. After discussing their needs with Boeing, T&WA signed a contract with Boeing to buy six 307s with an option for 13 more for $1,590,000 on January 29, 1937, with deliveries to be made in mid-1938. T&WA defaulted on their payments though and the T&WA markings which had already been applied to their airframes were removed. T&WA filed a lawsuit against Boeing for default of contract, and Boeing sued T&WA for breach of contract over the non-payment. Hughes had begun secretly buying up T&WA shares and by March 1939, Hughes has a controlling interest in Trans-World Airlines (or TWA - as it was rebranded once he had taken over), with roughly 46% of the shares. By August 1939, TWA and Boeing had resumed negotiations so TWA would get five 307s, and Hughes would get one. The cost to TWA had risen, and was now $1,750,000 or $350,000 per aircraft - three times the cost for Douglas DC-3s. In early 1940, Hughes bought up all remaining outstanding TWA shares not otherwise reserved for employees.

TWA received its first Stratoliner on May 6, 1940, and the last of their five was delivered on June 4, 1940. It was not their first four engine airliner, as one of their parent companies, Western Air Express had operated the Fokker F-32. All five were named in TWA promotional material for North American Indigenous tribes - names that would be used throughout their careers, continuing long after they left TWA. War intervened in December 1941, and civil aircraft production was halted, preventing any further deliveries. TWA first service flight was chosen to be on July 8, 1940, to coincide with anniversary of TAT's 48 hour coast-coast service, which had used trains for night legs. TWA's Stratoliners flew between Los Angeles and New York, making three stops.

TWA's Burbank - La Guardia flight via Chicago was 2 hours quicker than for a DC-3 (13:40 east and 15:38 west) with 3 stops in each direction.
The main route was La Guardia, NY to Chicago, Illinois to Kansas City, Missouri to Albuquerque, New Mexico to Burbank California and the reverse.

1940 was the best year for TWA, with 50% increase in passenger traffic over 1939, but they were still running exclusively in the red.

Flight 45 added additional stops at Philadelphia and Pittsburgh on December 1, 1940.

TWA ICD Wartime operations

On December 14, 1941, representatives from various airlines as well as the Air Transport Association of America (ATA) met with Colonel Robert Olds of the Air Corps Ferrying Command (later renamed Air Transport Command) over the use of their airliners in wartime. Pan Am had already signed a contract on the 13th, in which it would keep its 307s, but sell the 314s to the government. T&WA sold all five of its 307s to the USAAF, but would then operate them on behalf of the USAAF on a cost plus basis though a new subsidiary. At the time the Stratoliner was the only available landplane transport capable of transatlantic flights with any payload. Seaplanes were too slow and not numerous enough, while the Douglas C-54 Skymaster would not enter service until March 1942 and took months to be available in any numbers, aside from a few ad-hoc conversions from Consolidated B-24 Liberator bombers, the Consolidated C-87 Liberator Express wouldn't be ready until September 1942, and the Lockheed C-69 Constellation wouldn't fly until January 1943, while aircraft with two engines were considered unsafe for ocean crossings with VIPs on board.

On the entry of the United States into World War II, Pan Am continued operating its Stratoliners on routes to Central and South America, but under direction of the Army Air Forces' Air Transport Command, All five TWA Stratoliners were withdrawn from operations on December 24, 1941, while TWA created a subsidiary, the Intercontinental Division (ICD), whose civilian crews would operate them on behalf of the United States Army Air Forces. Otis Bryan was made head of the ICD The Stratoliners were sold to the USAAF, who assigned the type the C-75 designation, and each of them was given a USAAF serial number. The first of these was accepted by the USAAF on March 1, 1941, and the last one on December 17, 1942. ICD crews included pilots, 1st & 2nd officers, navigators, flight engineers, flight radio operators and pursers. ICD Supervisor pilots and captains were paid $1100/month, first officers $800/month, Navigators $600/month, Flight Engineers (FEs) $500/month and Flight Radio Operators (FROs) $400/month. Personnel were issued with USAAF uniforms which they wore with rank stripes (two solid stripes for a captain) but with civilian insignia.

The first ICD service flight began on February 26, when a 307 flew south to Brazil from Washington, before crossing the South Atlantic to Africa, and north to Cairo, before continuing on to Prestwick, Scotland where they arrived on April 20, 1942, having primarily carried 25,000 rounds of armour piercing shells to British troops in Cairo, who were facing Rommel and his Afrika Corps. ICD was initially set up at the crowded Washington Bolling Field but was soon transferred all of their operations to nearby Washington National Airport. Passengers continued to be loaded at Bolling Field, after flying the short hop from Washington National Airport.

The first north Atlantic crossing was in March 1942, when a flight from Washington to Prestwick carried senior military and government officials to Europe, which included the Army Chief of Staff General George C. Marshall, General Dwight D. Eisenhower (to command Operation Torch for the invasion of North Africa), Deputy Chief of Staff of Army Ground Forces General Mark W. Clark, Operation Torch Air Force liaison officer Colonel Hoyt Vandenberg, Chief of the Navy's Bureau of Aeronautics Rear Admiral John Henry Towers, who oversaw Navy aircraft procurement and training, and presidential advisors W. Averell Harriman and Harry Hopkins who were crossing to negotiate the lend-lease program. From April 22, regular crossings were being made. and ICD was growing rapidly, growing from 71 personnel in January, to 343 by April, and they were now making 16 ocean crossings a month. Following his April 1942 raid on Tokyo, but before it had been made public,  Jimmy Doolittle took a C-75 from Karachi in India through Khartoum, Kano, Accra, Robertsfield Airport, crossed the Atlantic to Natal in Brazil, and headed north to Belem, and from there with an additional fuel stop to Washington, DC, arriving in time for the news of the raid to be made public. Many of the surviving members of the raid followed soon after in another Stratoliner.

The North Atlantic ferry route was set up with help from former Arctic explorer Colonel Bernt Balchen, who assisted with Bluie East Two and Bluie East Eight in Greenland to reduce the Gander, Newfoundland - Scotland leg distance. The first aircraft to land at these fields, which were north of the Arctic Circle, was an ICD C-75, on April 20, 1942.

Marshall, Eisenhower, "Hap" Arnold and Admirals King and Towers flew to London from Washington via Montreal, Gander and Prestwick on May 23, 1942, and returned to Washington via Prestwick, Reykjavik and Gander. On June 20, 1942, Air Corps Ferrying Command became Air Transport Command

The exiled (but not yet deposed) King Peter II of Yugoslavia was flown in July 1942 from London to Washington to meet with North American leaders, with the engines leaned out so much that the last leg of the trip was able to skip numerous stops, so that they ended up being in the air for 21 hours 16 minutes when they arrived in Washington.

On July 10, 1942, Ascension Island's airfield opened in South Atlantic, shortening the hazardous transatlantic leg enough that smaller aircraft could now make the crossing, and the ICD C-75s would routinely lead flights of USAAF twin-engined aircraft, such as Douglas A-20s across.

In November 1943, a C-75 carried Soong Mei-Ling, wife of the Chinese Nationalist warlord Chiang Kai-Shek, from Chungking to Washington to receive medical care and to negotiate military aid for China.

Two main routes were flown, between Washington, D.C. and Cairo across the South Atlantic, and between New York and Prestwick, Scotland, across the North Atlantic. After July 1942 a refueling stop at Ascension Island was added in the South Atlantic. In the north, stops at Iceland or Greenland were often necessary, when flying west against unusually strong prevailing winds. As Douglas C-54 Skymasters took over the Gander to Prestwick route, the C-75s operated between Marrakech and Prestwick over the Atlantic.

ICD C-75s crossing the Atlantic had to be careful to avoid Allied convoys and German U-boats, to avoid being shot at. Many transatlantic trips were made at night, so the navigator could get good star sightings.

By 1944 the USAAF had enough long range transports that it no longer needed the small number of C-75s it had, and sold the fleet back to TWA, with the aircraft being transferred between January 6, 1944 and December 19, 1944. On August 11, 1942, ICD had received the first of 12 C-54s. and Pan Am would also supplement their Stratoliners with 12 C-54s. TWA received two C-54s in August and had 5 by September, and a full allotment of 12 by November, along with the first three C-87s, to supplement the C-75s. At the same time Curtiss C-46 Commandos, Douglas C-47s and C-53s provided feeder links to the C-75s, C-54s and C-87s, as their range was inadequate for the Atlantic.

By the time they were withdrawn, over 3000 trans-oceanic crossings had been made, and they had flown 21,284 while in USAAF service with the ICD. The sole accident occurred during night landing at Natal in Brazil when an undercarriage leg was torn off by a mound of dirt.

It cost TWA about $2 million to have the five aircraft rebuilt by Boeing and the first of them resumed passenger service on April 1, 1945. The CAA recertified these as SA-307B-1 civilian airliners with their original registration numbers.

TWA post-war service and disposal

On April 1, 1945, the first post-war civil commercial flight was made by Zuni, now as a SA-307B-1, from La Guardia to San Francisco via Pittsburgh, Saint Louis, Kansas City, Albuquerque, and Burbank, but the second transcontinental flight didn't happen until a month later, when on May 1, 1945, a flight was made from Washington, DC to Spokane, Washington, via Dayton Municipal Airport, St Louis, Kansas City, Albuquerque and Burbank, reflected a loosening of the tightly controlled government access to routes. TWA's fare structure remained the same as pre-war.
New TWA flight routes were added with routes 370 & 371 between La Guardia and Spokane with intermediate stops in Chicago, Albuquerque, for fuel, and Burbank and routes 48 & 49 between La Guardia and Kansas City with a stop in St Louis. At this time, the TWA Stratoliners were briefly the sole four-engine commercial airliner in domestic service in the US.

On July 10, 1939, TWA had signed a contract with Lockheed to develop the Constellation, which was to be capable of 5 miles/min compared to the Stratoliner's 4 miles/min, but with production diverted to military for the duration of the war, the first TWA Constellations didn't enter service until February 1946 and were soon grounded dealing with the usual teething problems encountered with a new type, from July 11 to September 20, 1946, while the Douglas DC-4s began arriving in 1946 in small numbers and the Douglas DC-6 similarly, from 1947. At the same time, due to strong competition from war-surplus non-sked flights operating cheaply purchased war-surplus Douglas C-54s, in May 1949 the Stratoliner's were downgraded to a coach-only service with the fares slashed by a third. The first coach service, from New York La Guardia to Chicago via Pittsburgh was made on June 1, 1949, with a full load of 38 passengers.

In November 1950, TWA introduced the similarly sized but cheaper to operate twin-engine Martin 2-0-2A on domestic routes, and transferred some DC-4s from international routes to domestic service, supplementing the Stratoliners which were mainly being used for service between La Guardia and cities in the mid-west, until TWA finally phased them out between April and July 1951. At that time the aircraft had an average of 25,205 hours flying time, each, with Cherokee having the most with 26,324 hours, and they had covered  while in ICD service.

Pan American Airways (Pan Am) 

In 1937 Pan American Airways placed their first order for two Stratoliners, which they soon increased to six. Deliveries to Pan Am started in March 1940, and they had received their first three before war intervened and civil aircraft production halted. The other three would not be built. All three were named for historically notable Clipper ships. Pan Am carried out their first revenue flight on July 4, 1940, with service between Miami, Brownsville, Texas and Los Angeles. Unlike TWA, Pan Am did not exclusively assign their aircraft to specific routes, and instead they were used for their Latin American routes and ranged from Miami and Los Angeles to Brazil.

At the same time TWA's Stratoliners were getting new wings and tails, Pan Am's 307s were being modified in Miami to repair the cracked spar tubing with doublers, and didn't get new wings or engines, and the maximum gross weight remained the same. Pan-Am flights then resumed between Miami, the Caribbean and Belem, until all three were sold to the "Airline Training Company" of Miami in late 1948 and early 1949, before being sold on to other operators.

The former Clipper Comet NC19910, was sold to Aerovias Ecuatorianas (AREA) in Ecuador, in 1951, who used it as Quito with the registration HC 004 to provide service between Ecuador and Miami. From 1955, it was with Quaker City Airways for two years as N75385, making non-scheduled charter flights. On May 10, 1958, while still carrying the same registration and after having been stored for some time, it was being readied to be ferried to Boeing for modification for use as a crop duster, but flight tests were carried out despite finding fuel leaks whose source couldn't be determined, and with untested auxiliary fuel tanks installed in the cabin. During the flight test, it caught fire, and while the crew landed it safely on a boulder-strewn mesa and the crew escaped unharmed, the airframe was destroyed by the fire.

The former Clipper Rainbow NC19902, was to have been sold to the short lived Mercury Airways of South Africa, and was even given a South African registration, ZS-BWU, however the sale was never completed, and likewise, it was supposed to have been sold to Aerovias Ecuatorianas, with registration HC-SJC-003, but that sale also appears to have fallen through, and in 1951 it was sold to Aigle Azur as F-BHHR.

The former Clipper Flying Cloud NC19903, was purchased by the Corps d'Aviation d'Garde d'Haiti (Haitian Air Force) in 1954 and assigned the number 2003, but plans to use it for a passenger service by the Compagnie Haïtienne de Transports Aériens (CoHaTA) were cancelled and it was fitted out as a Presidential transport. When François "Papa Doc" Duvalier came into power in 1957 he chose not to use it, and instead had the aircraft sold the same year, with the money from the sale going toward five North American T-6G Texan training aircraft. This aircraft returned to the U.S. and after brielfy being registered as N9307R and N19903, is now restored and at the Smithsonian Museum as NC19903.

Aigle Azur and Union Aéromaritime de Transport

TWA sold all five TWA SA-307B-1s to the French operator Aigle Azur (French for Blue Eagle) in April 1951, for $525,000, along with their remaining supply of spares. Aigle Azur received them between May 14, 1951, and December 19, 1951. and modified these for 48 passengers in Bordeau, and used them on scheduled flights between Paris and North and Central Africa (Casablanca, Dakar, Tunis) Madagascar, French West Africa and French Equatorial Africa and later in 1952, to French Indo-China.

The Stratoliners were no longer competitive against the larger and faster Douglas DC-6 and Lockheed Constellation then entering service, which on May 1, 1955, led to Aigle Azur along with its subsidiary in Asia, Aigle Azur Indochine, being bought by Union Aéromaritime de Transport (UAT). On the same date, Aigle Azur Indochine was renamed Aigle Azur Extreme-Orient. On September 16, 1955, F-BELV, F-BELX, F-BELY, and F-BELZ were transferred from Europe to Aigle Azur Extreme-Orient, mainly for charter work. During 1955 and 1956, F-BELU and F-BELY and F-BELZ returned to Europe to be leased to Airnautic. The former Pan Am aircraft, F-BHHR had joined Aigle Azur in 1951 and was transferred to Aigle Azur Extreme-Orient in March 1957. Aigle Azur Extrême-Orient branding was retained for several years before the aircraft were repainted in UAT Aéromaritime colors.

After four years in service in Asia, during which it was briefly leased to Air Laos Transport Aériens (later renamed Royal Air Lao) and assigned the Laotian XW registration XW-TAC, F-BHHR was destroyed in an accident on May 22, 1961, while being operated by Aigle Azur Extreme-Orient on a non-scheduled Saigon-Vientiane passenger flight, with 28 on board. It had departed from Tan Son Nhat International Airport in Saigon and was heading for Vientiane when the number four engine had to be shut down, and when it returned to land, it overshot the runway in deteriorating weather, and a violent squall or microburst blew it sideways, causing it to hit the ground. All 28 people on board survived but the aircraft was wrecked.

Union Aéromaritime de Transport merged with Transports Aériens Intercontinentaux, to become Union de Transports Aériens UTA on October 1, 1963, but by then had already sold all of its Stratoliners to CITCA.

Airnautic

Airnautic (or Air Nautic) received three ex-Aigle Azur SA-307B-1s in 1955 and 1956 including, F-BELU, F-BELY, and F-BELZ, which were operated in southern Europe around the Mediterranean providing charter flights, especially around Corsica.

On December 29, 1962, F-BELZ collided with a mountain while on a charter flight with 22 basketball players and fans while flying from Bastia to Ajaccio, on the island of Corsica.

In 1965, F-BELY and F-BELU were returned to CITCA, who then leased them to other operators.

Air France became the principal shareholder of Airnautic in 1962, at which time it purchased DC-6s, and in 1966 Airnautic ceased to exist, having been absorbed into Air France.

Compagnie Internationale de Transports Civil Aériens (CITCA)

Compagnie Internationale de Transports Civil Aériens (CITCA) bought five Stratoliners, F-BELU F-BELV F-BELX F-BELY F-BELZ, which were leased out to other operators.

In 1965, Cambodia Air Commercial leased F-BELY as XW-PGR, and F-BELU as XW-TFP, before both went to Royal Air Lao the same year, which then leased all five of the CITCA Stratoliners, which were also assigned Laotian XW registrations, and F-BELV, became XW-TAA, and F-BELX, became XW-TFR. The Air Laos Transport Aériens and Royal Air Lao Stratoliners were flown between Vientiane and Hong Kong with a large detour around North Vietnam. Royal Air Laos was operating XW-TFP and XW-PGR when they were destroyed in accidents, while F-BELV would be leased to Royal Air Cambodge.

On February 27, 1971, XW-PGR collided with a Lao Air Force Douglas C-47 while landing at Luang Prabang, Laos, and damage to the left wing was unrepairable due to a lack of spares.

The Commission Internationale de Contrôle (International Control Commission in English) (CIC/ICC) and its successor International Commission of Control and Supervision leased three aircraft in 1964, under their old French registrations of  F-BELV, F-BELU, and F-BELX, which now had seating for as many as 60, and were used to  provide what were often hazardous diplomatic flights around south-east Asia until 1974, when it suspended operations with the impending defeat of US forces in Vietnam. Passengers usually included diplomats, members of the Red Cross, press, businessmen and Control Commission officials.

On this flight, there were five CIC delegates from India, three from Canada and one from Poland, as well as four French crew members, all of whom died. Due to radio interference, a message indicating that their clearance period had been delayed was never received. Poor communications meant it took until the next day, and around 19 hours before anyone realized the aircraft had gone missing as the destination airport had assumed it had returned to its point of origin, and that airport was unaware it hadn't arrived at its destination. The search for the downed aircraft was delayed further due to the need to negotiate access to the likely crash area, with several warring parties wary from previous experience of the search mission being a cover for either intelligence gathering, or other military activities. A Canadian investigation long after the war determined that it had likely been shot down by North Vietnamese anti-aircraft fire, but they were unable to determine if it was intentional or not.

XW-TFR (previously F-BELX and briefly XW-TAB) had been returned to Cambodia Air Commercial when it was destroyed in an accident on June 27, 1974, following three of the four engines failing while climbing out from Battambang Airport. During the forced landing it collided with trees causing extensive damage, including tearing one wing off before the aircraft caught fire. 17 passengers and two crew members out of the 39 on board died in the crash that the crash investigation blamed on poor maintenance.

The pilot of XW-TFP was forced to ditch in the Mekong river on March 13, 1975, near the Laos-Thailand border while on a flight from Hong Kong to Vientiane. Both the pilot and co-pilot escaped the wreck but were captured by the communist Pathet Lao and held until May. The wreckage was still there in 1986.

Operators

Civilian operators

Howard Hughes bought one aircraft.
Inter-American Inc. (IA) bought ex-Pan Am Clipper Flying Cloud from the Haitian Government.
Pan American Airways (PAA: Pan Am) received three aircraft.
Trans World Airlines (TWA) received five aircraft.
Quaker City Airways, operated ex-Pan Am Clipper Comet.

Aerovias Ecuatorianas CA/AREA Ecuador, operated an ex-Pan Am aircraft as HC 004.

Aigle Azur (en:Blue Eagle) operated five ex-TWA aircraft and one Pan-Am aircraft, all bought in 1951.
Air Nautic (or Airnautic) operated three aircraft.
Commission Internationale de Contrôle (International Control Commission in English) (CIC/ICC) and its successor International Commission of Control and Supervision operated at least three aircraft leased from UAT and CITCA. 
Compagnie Internationale de Transports Civil Aériens (CITCA) leased out ex-UAT aircraft to other operators.
Union Aéromaritime de Transport (UAT) operated the Aigle Azur aircraft after buying them out.

 (Fr: Air Laos/Air Laos Transport Aériens) leased one ex-Pan Am/ex-Aigle Azur aircraft, before being renamed Royal Air Lao.
 operated four ex-Aigle Azur aircraft.
 
 (Fr: Royal Air Cambodge) operated one aircraft with French registration.
Cambodia Air Commerciale operated several aircraft, under Laos registrations.

Military operators
 
Haitian Air Corps
Compagnie Haïtienne de Transports Aériens (CoHaTA) (a Military transport organization) operated one ex-Pan Am 307.
 
 United States Army Air Forces operated five ex-TWA SA-307Bs as C-75s. Three Pan Am 307s operated under USAAF direction, but ownership remained with Pan Am.

Accidents and incidents
The Boeing 307 was involved in eight hull-loss incidents with 67 fatalities. Four of the ten incidents involved fatalities, with one likely being shot down while in a war zone.

Surviving aircraft

The sole intact Boeing 307 Stratoliner, NC19903 is preserved in flying condition at the Smithsonian's Steven F. Udvar-Hazy Center. After having been restored to flying condition, it was being delivered to the Smithsonian on what was to be its last flight when it ran out of fuel and ditched in Elliott Bay near Seattle, Washington in March 2002. Despite the incident, it was raised and again restored, and it completed its flight to the Smithsonian, where it was placed on display.

The forward fuselage of Howard Hughes' 307 (NX19904) also survives, although it was stripped of flying surfaces and the rear fuselage, and converted into a houseboat. The aircraft was awaiting restoration at Fort Lauderdale International Airport in August 1964 when it was severely damaged when Hurricane Cleo tore it loose from its tiedowns, and it was blown into a stand of trees. The aircraft was later salvaged and converted into a house boat and the interior remains notable for the additions made when owned by Howard Hughes. It is now part of the Florida Air Museum's collection.

Specifications (Boeing SA-307B, #726)

See also

Notes

References

Bibliography

External links

T&WA promotional video with footage of Stratoliner 

307
1930s United States airliners
Four-engined tractor aircraft
Low-wing aircraft
307
Aircraft first flown in 1938
Four-engined piston aircraft